Pattani (or Patani in Malay spelling) may refer to:

Places
 Patani (historical region), a historical region in the Malay peninsula, in Thailand and Malaysia.
 Pattani Province, modern province in southern Thailand
 Pattani, Thailand, the capital of the province
 Mueang Pattani District, the district that includes the town
 Patani Kingdom, a former semi-independent Malay sultanate
 Monthon Pattani, an administrative subdivision (monthon) in the early 20th century and follow-up to the kingdom
 Pattani River
 Patani, Nigeria, a town in Delta State, Nigeria
 Patani, Indonesia, a village in North Maluku, Indonesia

Other uses
 HTMS Pattani (OPV 511), a Royal Thai Navy vessel
 Pattani F.C., a football club of the town of Pattani
 Pattani language, a Himalayan language of India
 Kelantan-Pattani Malay, a Malayan language spoken in the Patani region
 Silat Pattani, a style of silat
 Patani FC, a former football club of Yerevan, Armenia
 Disha Patani, Indian actress and model
 Patani language, an Austronesian language of Halmahera, Indonesia

See also 
 Patan (disambiguation)
 Pathan (disambiguation)
 Hikayat Patani, a semi-legendary set of tales about the Pattani kingdom of Thailand
 Pathani, a Rajput clan of Uttarakhand, India
 Pathania, a Rajput clan of Himachal Pradesh, India